Artyom Pavlovich Kovalenko (born 6 August 1981) is a retired Russian football player.

Honours
 Russian Premier League bronze: 1999.

External links
 

1981 births
Footballers from Moscow
Living people
Russian footballers
Association football midfielders
Russian Premier League players
PFC CSKA Moscow players
FC Asmaral Moscow players